Off Road with Gul Panag is an infotainment adventure documentary hosted by Gul Panag on the Discovery Channel.

Background

Gul and her friend Swati had been planning a trip for long and eventually decided to go forth with it. That's when Gul Panag decides to turn the get away trip to an adventure trip. And thus was born the idea to go Off Roading across the Leh Ladakh terrain on a Mahindra Scorpio Getaway vehicle.

Season 1, comprising three episodes, features Gul Panag with her friend Swati, travel on a Mahindra Scorpio Get-Away to Leh-Ladakh.

Episodes

References

External links
 Off Road with Gul Panag: Ladakh Discovery Channel official site

Discovery Channel original programming